Martin Andersen Nexø (26 June 1869 – 1 June 1954) was a Danish writer. He was one of the authors in the Modern Breakthrough movement in Danish art and literature. He was a socialist throughout his life and during the second world war moved to the Soviet Union, and afterwards to Dresden in East Germany.

Biography
Martin Andersen Nexø was born into a large family (the fourth of eleven children) in Christianshavn, at the time an impoverished district of Copenhagen. In 1877 his family moved to Nexø on Bornholm, and he adopted the name of this town as his last name. Having been an industrial worker before, in Nexø he attended a folk high school, and later worked as a journalist. He spent the mid-1890s travelling in Southern Europe, and his book Soldage (1903) (English: Days in the Sun) is largely based on those travels. Like many of his literary contemporaries, including Johannes Vilhelm Jensen, Nexø was at first heavily influenced by  fin-de-siècle pessimism, but gradually turned to a more extroverted view, joining the Social Democratic movement and later the Communist Party of Denmark; his later books reflect his political support of the Soviet Union.

Pelle Erobreren (English: Pelle the Conqueror), published in four volumes 1906–1910, is his best-known work and the one most translated. Its first section was made the subject of the DDR-FS movie Pelle der Eroberer in 1986 and the movie  Pelle Erobreren in 1987. Ditte Menneskebarn (English: Ditte, Child of Man), written from 1917 to 1921, praises the working woman for her self-sacrifice; a Danish film version of the first part of the book was released in 1946 as Ditte, Child of Man. The much-debated Midt i en Jærntid (i.e. "In an Iron Age", English: In God's Land), written in 1929,  satirises the Danish farmers of World War I. During his latter years, 1944 to 1956, Nexø wrote but did not complete a trilogy consisting of the books Morten hin Røde (English: Morten the Red), Den fortabte generation (English: The Lost Generation), and Jeanette. This was ostensibly a continuation of Pelle the Conqueror, but also a masked autobiography.

In 1941, during  Denmark's occupation by the  Germany, Danish police arrested Nexø due to his communist affiliation. Upon his release he traveled to neutral Sweden and then to the Soviet Union, where he made broadcasts to Nazi-occupied Denmark and Norway. After World War II, Nexø moved to Dresden in East Germany, where he was made an honorary citizen. The  Martin-Andersen-Nexø-Gymnasium high school in Dresden was named after him. His international reputation as one of the greatest European social writers grew, especially, but not exclusively, in socialist countries.

Nexø died in Dresden in 1954 and was interred in the Assistens Kirkegård in the Nørrebro neighbourhood of Copenhagen. A minor planet, 3535 Ditte, discovered by Soviet astronomer Nikolai Stepanovich Chernykh in 1979, is named after the main character in his novel Ditte, Child of Man.
Martin Andersen Nexø's home in Nexø has become a museum in his memory.

Honours and awards
In 1949, Nexø received an honorary doctorate from the University of Greifswald's Faculty of Arts.

Nexø's works in English
 Ditte: Towards The Stars. Translated by Asta & Rowland Kenney. New York: H. Holt. 1922.
 Days in the Sun. Translated by Jacob Wittmer Hartmann. 1929. (travel book)
 In God's Land. Translated by Thomas Seltzer. 1933.
 Under the Open Sky. My early Years. Translated by J. B. C. Watkins. 1938. (part of an autobiography)
 Pelle the Conqueror 1–2. Translated by Jesse Muir and Bernard Miall. Gloucester, Mass. 1963.
 Ditte. Gloucester, Mass. 1963.
 Pelle the Conqueror. Volume 1: Childhood. Translated by Steven T. Murray. Seattle, WA. New translation from Fjord Press. 1989.
 Pelle the Conqueror. Volume 2: Apprenticeship. Translated by Steven T. Murray & Tiina Nunnally. Seattle, WA. New translation from Fjord Press. 1991.

Film 

A film adaptation "Pelle the Conqueror" was made in 1987, directed by Bille August and starring Max van Sydow. It has been licensed for streaming by several services recently.

Literature
Haugan, Jørgen. Alt er som bekendt erotik: En biografi om Martin Andersen Nexø. København: Gad, 1998. 
 Ingwersen, Faith & Ingwersen, Niels: Quests for a Promised Land: The Works of Martin Andersen Nexø. 1984. .
 Yde, Henrik: Det grundtvigske i Martin Andersen Nexøs liv I–II. ('The Grundtvig'ian in the life of Martin Andersen Nexø.' Doctor’s thesis, 1991.) .
 Yde, Henrik: Martin Andersen Nexø. An Introduction. (in Nordica, vol. 11. 1994).

References

External links

 
 
 
 
 

1869 births
1954 deaths
People from Copenhagen
Danish communists
Danish journalists
Marxist writers
Danish emigrants to East Germany
Socialist realism writers
Proletarian literature
Danish male novelists
People granted political asylum in the Soviet Union
20th-century Danish novelists